Jordi Amat Fusté (born 1978, Barcelona) is a Spanish essayist, philologist, editor and cultural critic, expert in the 20th-century intellectual history of Catalonia and the rest of Spain. He writes in both the Catalan and Spanish languages.

Works 
Author
 Luis Cernuda. Fuerza de soledad i Las voces del diálogo. Madrid: Espasa Calpe, 2002.
 Las voces del diálogo. Poesía y política en el medio siglo. Barcelona: Península, 2007 (Premi d'Assaig Casa de América). .
 Dionisio Ridruejo: Casi unas memorias. Edició de Jordi Amat. Barcelona: Península, 2012.
 Roc Boronat, el republicà que va fundar el Sindicat de Cecs. Amb Betsabé Garcia. Barcelona: Pòrtic, 2008.  .
 Els Coloquios Cataluña-Castilla (1964-1971). Debat sobre el model territorial de l'Espanya democràtica. Barcelona: PAM, 2010.
 Els laberints de la llibertat: Vida de Ramon Trias Fargas. Barcelona: La Magrana, 2009 (Premi Gaziel de Biografies i Memòries). .
 Querido amigo, estimado maestro: cartas a Guillermo Díaz-Plaja (1929-1984). Jordi Amat, Blanca Bravo Cela, Ana Díaz-Plaja Taboada (eds.). Barcelona: Universitat de Barcelona, 2009. .
 El llarg procés: cultura i política a la Catalunya contemporània 1937-2014. Barcelona: Tusquets, 2015. .
 Un país a l'ombra. Vida de Josep Maria Vilaseca Marcet (1919-1995). Barcelona: L'Avenç, 2015. .
 La primavera de Múnich. Esperanza y fracaso de una transición democrática. Barcelona: Tusquets, 2016.
 Com una pàtria. Vida de Josep Benet. Barcelona: Edicions 62, 2017. .
 La confabulació dels irresponsables. Barcelona: Anagrama, 2017.
 La conjura de los irresponsables. Barcelona: Anagrama, 2017.
 Largo proceso, amargo sueño. Cultura y política en la Cataluña contemporánea. Barcelona: Tusquets, 2018.
 El fill del xofer. Barcelona: Edicions 62, 2020.
 El hijo del chofer. Barcelona: Tusquets, 2020.
Coauthor
 
Editor

References

Bibliography 
 
 
 
 
 
 
 
 

Spanish philologists
Spanish essayists
Catalan-language writers
1978 births
Living people